Christian Wolff may refer to:

People
 Christian Wolff (philosopher) (1679–1754), German philosopher and mathematician
 Christian Wolff (baroque composer) (1705–1773), German composer
 Christian Wolff (composer) (born 1934), American composer of experimental classical music
 Christian Wolff (actor) (born 1938), German actor

Characters
The main character in the 2016 American action thriller film The Accountant

See also 
 Christian Wolf, board game designer
 Christian Wulff (born 1959), President of Germany, 2010–2012
 Christian Wulff (disambiguation)